Lesley Turner (born 1983) is an Irish beauty queen who represented her country at the Miss Universe 2001 pageant in San Juan, Puerto Rico. Turner competed in the Miss Ireland Universe 2001 pageant at the age of 18, and she won the title and the rights to represent Ireland at the Miss Universe 2001 pageant. She hails from Newport, Co Tipperary.

References

1983 births
20th-century Irish people
21st-century Irish people
Irish beauty pageant winners
Irish female models
Living people
Miss Universe 2001 contestants
People from County Tipperary